The GT Asia Series was a sports car racing series based in Asia. The championship combines FIA GT3 specification cars as the elite class of the series with Ferrari Challenge, Porsche Cup and older GT3 machinery competing in the GTM class.

The series had its first season in 2010 with a dozen GT3 cars and has since expanded with grid sizes of 26 or more cars and a 13-round calendar visiting tracks in China, Malaysia, Japan and Thailand.

The Series is organized by the Asian Festival of Speed (AFOS) and sanctioned by the FIA.

In October 2016, the GT Asia Series announced a partnership with the Asian Le Mans Series. It includes a new Michelin Asia GT Challenge, which is a combined classification for GT3 teams, where the winner will get an invitation to the 24 Hours of Le Mans.

In April 2017, the GT Asia Series was announced to merge with the China GT Championship.

Champions

References

External links
 

 
Recurring sporting events established in 2010
Group GT3